Edward Albert Galigher (October 15, 1950 – November 27, 2018) was a professional American football defensive lineman who played for seven seasons for the San Francisco 49ers and the New York Jets.

Galigher graduated from Sunset High School in Hayward, California in 1968.

Galigher played football for Chabot College in Hayward in 1968 and 1969.

References

1950 births
2018 deaths
Sportspeople from Hayward, California
Players of American football from California
American football defensive tackles
American football defensive ends
UCLA Bruins football players
San Francisco 49ers players
New York Jets players
Chabot Gladiators football players